The Trinity Court Building was a building in Lower Manhattan, New York City.

History 
The earliest building to carry the name was built in 1879 for the Western Union Telegraph Company. It had six stories, 5,000 square feet of space, stores on the ground floor, and commercial lofts in the rest.

Western Union sold it in 1888. The building was the focus of a complex tort in the 1890s over property value loss due to the operation of the Manhattan Elevated Railroad (later IRT Sixth Avenue Line) in front of it. The builder (Western Union) and the defendant (railway) were both controlled by the same group of investors, who were asserted to be in collusion against buyer Augustus D. Shepard to nullify any damages collected.  Mutual Life Assurance foreclosed on the building in 1914, and auctioned it to Alliance Realty. It was sold in 1919 to Frazar & Co, which was believed to have had plans to replace it with a new skyscraper.

The building was demolished in 1926. It was built in place the Trinity Court Building (1927–2015) (II).

References 

Buildings and structures completed in 1879
Buildings and structures demolished in 1926
Financial District, Manhattan
Skyscraper office buildings in Manhattan
Demolished buildings and structures in Manhattan